The 2004 Insight Bowl was the 16th edition of the bowl game. It featured the Notre Dame Fighting Irish, and the Oregon State Beavers.

Oregon State scored first on a 12-yard touchdown pass from Derek Anderson to wide receiver George Gillett to take a 7–0 lead. Derek Anderson later found tight end Joe Newton for an 11-yard touchdown pass to take a 14–0 lead.

In the second quarter Derek Anderson threw an 11-yard touchdown pass to Derek Haines, making it 21–0 OSU. Notre Dame got on the board with a 13-yard touchdown pass from Brady Quinn to Anthony Fasano, making the halftime score 21–7 Oregon State.

In the third quarter, Alexis Serna made a 38-yard field goal to increase Oregon State's lead to 24–7. Notre Dame running back Darius Walker scored on a 5-yard touchdown run to make it 24–14 Oregon State. In the fourth quarter, Derek Anderson threw his fourth touchdown pass of the game, a 1-yarder to Joe Newton to make it 31–14 Oregon State. Brady Quinn's 18-yard touchdown pass to Rhema McKnight, made it 31–21 OSU. A 2-yard Dwight Wright touchdown run made the final score 38–21 Oregon State.

References

Insight Bowl
Guaranteed Rate Bowl
Notre Dame Fighting Irish football bowl games
Oregon State Beavers football bowl games
December 2004 sports events in the United States
Insight Bowl
2000s in Phoenix, Arizona
Sports in Phoenix, Arizona